Ivanychi is an urban settlement (town) in Volyn Oblast (province), located in the historic region of the Volhynia. It is an administrative seat of the Ivanychi settlement hromada. Population:

Notable figures
 Ihor Lapin - Ukrainian lawyer, politician and military commander.
 Oksana Kukhta - Ukrainian wrestler.

References

External links
 Ivanychi at the Ukrainian Soviet Encyclopedia

Urban-type settlements in Volodymyr Raion